The Feral Cat Coalition of Oregon (FCCO), originally named the Feral Cat Coalition of Portland (FCCP), is a nonprofit trap–neuter–return (TNR) organization based in Portland, Oregon. The organization's mission is to improve the lives and reduce the population of stray and feral cats through spay/neuter services and education. FCCO offers spay and neuter services to caregivers of stray and feral cats and low cost services for pet cats.

History
The Feral Cat Coalition of Oregon (FCCO), originally named the Feral Cat Coalition of Portland (FCCP), was formed by a group of Portland-based veterinarians in March 1995. In the first three years, monthly spay/neuter clinics were held at veterinary hospitals in the Portland, Oregon area.

In February 1998, the organization was renamed to its current name to reflect that its services would be provided throughout the state of Oregon. The renaming coincided with the arrival of a mobile clinic, purchased with help from the Leonard X. Bosack and Bette M. Kruger Foundation. The organization states that the mobile veterinary hospital was the first of its kind in North America, and continues to serve as the only mobile clinic specifically for feral cats.

The organization also has a free-standing spay/neuter clinic in Portland.

By 2004, the FCCO had neutered 20,000 cats. In September 2011, the organization's 50,000th cat was neutered, a five-month old grey and white kitten from Kelso, Washington, named Oscar. In September 2014, FCCO neutered its 70,000th cat, a small black female cat from southeast Portland. In July 2019, FCCO neutered its 100,000th cat, Bo.

Partnership with Audubon Society of Portland
The organization has a long-standing partnership with the Audubon Society of Portland. In 2012, leaders from both organizations wrote to the Portland Tribune jointly about their position on cats and wildlife. They expressed concern about cat predation on wildlife, at the same time acknowledging that cats "are companion animals that we too often have treated as disposable", with "obscene numbers" of them being euthanized at local shelters. They determined that in the short-term, "natural areas that have been set aside for wildlife need to be the top priority for removal of free-roaming cats, and we are working together to make sure that feral cat colonies are not established in these locations. On the rest of our urban landscape, we recognize that a variety of approaches, including trap, neuter and return, should be included as part of the solution."

The Audubon Society of Portland's position on cats and wildlife on its website provides a guarded endorsement of trap–neuter–return, urging that cat owners keep their pets indoors: "In general, Portland Audubon has no objection to TNR as long as managed colonies are located away from designated wildlife areas and at-risk wildlife populations, and the program is coupled with a strong message that cats should be housed indoors."

The FCCO publishes a position statement advocating for "Cats Safe At Home", encouraging people not to allow their cats to roam, and using alternatives such as leash walking and safe outdoor enclosures.

In 2014, the two organizations hosted their second annual "Catio Tour" to showcase safe outdoor enclosures for domestic cats. The 7th annual catio tour was held September 7, 2019.

Partnership with Multnomah County Animal Services
The FCCO has a partnership with Multnomah County Animal Services. Their "Apartment Cat Team" (ACT) works with managers and tenants of low-income or subsidized apartment complexes and mobile home parks, offering free or low-cost neutering for cats. The program also provides trap-neuter-return services for feral cats, and wherever possible, socializing feral kittens for adoption into homes.

See also
Alley Cat Allies

References

External links
 Official Website

Feral cats
Organizations based in Portland, Oregon
Non-profit organizations based in Oregon
1995 establishments in Oregon
Animal welfare organizations based in the United States
Trap–neuter–return organizations